The Australian National Netball Championships are a series of annual netball tournaments, organised by Netball Australia and featuring representative teams from the states and territories of Australia. The earliest tournaments took place during 1920s. 

Until 2005, the championships featured an open tournament, as well tournaments for under-17, under-19 and under-21 teams. However, following the emergence  of the Commonwealth Bank Trophy league, Netball Australia decided to end the open tournament. The last under-21 tournament was played in 2016.

History

Early tournaments
The earliest Australian National Netball Championships took place during 1920s. Differing sources mean it is unclear exactly which year the tournament was first held. According to the 2005 Netball New South Wales annual report, New South Wales won their first title in 1926. Meanwhile, according to the Netball Victoria website, Victoria hosted and won the first official championships in 1928 in Melbourne.
According to the 2004 Netball Australia annual report, the 2004 National Netball Championships were the 71st edition. However according to the 2005 annual report there had been eighty years of open competition.

Open
In 2004, the open and under-21 National Netball Championships were held at Challenge Stadium in Perth, Western Australia. According to the 2004 Netball Australia annual report, they were the 71st National Netball Championships. 
The 2004 tournament featured several members of the Australia national netball team, including Liz Ellis, Catherine Cox, Jane Altschwager and Mo'onia Gerrard, as well as emerging players such as Natalie Medhurst, Kimberley Smith, Joanne Sutton, Johannah Curran, Susan Fuhrmann and Brooke Thompson. In 2005, Netball ACT hosted the final open championships in Canberra. Following the emergence  of the Commonwealth Bank Trophy league, Netball Australia decided to end the open tournament.

Grand finals

Notes 
  New South Wales, South Australia and Victoria shared the 1956 title.
  New South Wales, South Australia and Western Australia shared the 1976 title.
  New South Wales and South Australia shared the 1979 title.
  The 2001 tournament was cancelled due to the Ansett collapse

Under-21

Grand finals

Tournament MVP

Notes 
  The 2001 tournament was cancelled due to the Ansett collapse
  The 2007 Netball Australia Annual Report gives the final score as 61–36 while the 2007 Netball NSW Annual Report gives it as 36–21.
  April Letton and Chanel Gomes shared the 2010 Under-21 Tournament MVP award.

Under-19

Grand finals

Tournament MVP

Under-17

Grand finals

Tournament MVP

Notes
   The 2020 and 2021 tournaments were cancelled due to the COVID-19 pandemic in Australia.

Main sponsors

References

Netball competitions in Australia
National championships in Australia
Under-21 sport
Under-19 sport
Under-17 sport